Grindrod is an unincorporated designated place in the North Okanagan Regional District, British Columbia, Canada. The community is located on the western bank of the Shuswap River, north of Enderby, and is sometimes considered to be part of the Shuswap Country. The population was 1,453 at the 2011 census.

References 

Designated places in British Columbia
Unincorporated settlements in British Columbia